Sarayevo is a rural locality (a village) in Mayskoye Rural Settlement, Vologodsky District, Vologda Oblast, Russia. The population was 2 as of 2002.

Geography 
The distance to Vologda is 25 km, to Maysky is 10km. Kovylievo is the nearest village, creek Mesha

References 

Rural localities in Vologodsky District